van der Vaart is a Dutch surname. Notable people with the surname include:

Aad van der Vaart (born 1959), Dutch statistician
Donald van der Vaart, American chemical engineer and lawyer
Hubertus van der Vaart, Dutch American businessman
Jan van der Vaart (1931–2000), Dutch ceramist
Macha van der Vaart (born 1972), Dutch field hockey player
Rafael van der Vaart (born 1983), Dutch footballer
Sylvie van der Vaart (born 1978), Dutch television personality and model

See also 
 Jan van der Vaardt (c. 1650–1727), Dutch painter

Dutch-language surnames
Surnames of Dutch origin